Buchu Monastery, Buchu Sergyi Lhakhang, or Buchasergyi Lakang Monastery is a temple in an ancient monastery about 28 km south of the modern town of Bayi, which replaces the old village of Drakchi, in Nyingchi County of eastern Tibet.

Description
The two-storied monastery has a striking golden roof which can be seen from afar. There have been only eight monks living here recently.

Previously the temple contained images of the Eight Manifestations of Padmasambhava, and the upper floor had eight images of Amitayus which have not yet been restored. The lower part of the large Padmasambhava downstairs survived, and still contains the zungjuk or mantra-core.

History
The original buildings here were built during the 7th century reign of King Songtsen Gampo. It was created as one of the eight "demoness-subduing" temples, and was constructed according to geomantic theory on the right elbow of the ogress who represented Tibet. It is the oldest Buddhist structure in the eastern Tibetan region of Kongpo. It originally belonged to the Nyingmapa, but by the 17th century there were Gelugpa present here, and it formally adopted by them during the time of the Regent, Demo Rinpoche (r.1886-1895).

Geomancy 
The temple is part of a network of 12 temples arranged around Jo-khang temple at Lhasa. All of them were built in the time of King Songtsen Gampo.

Footnotes

References
Dorje, Gyurme. (1999). Footprint Tibet Handbook with Bhutan. (2nd Ed.) Footprint Handbooks, Bath, England. .
Mayhew, Bradley and Kohn, Michael Tibet. (2005). 6th Edition. Lonely Planet. .

Buddhist monasteries in Tibet
Buddhist_temples_in_Tibet
Gelug monasteries
7th-century establishments in Tibet